Dalriada can refer to:
 Dál Riata, a Gaelic kingdom in western Scotland and north-east Ireland in the Early Middle Ages
 Dalriada School, a co-educational, voluntary grammar school in Ballymoney, Northern Ireland
 Dalriada (band), Hungarian folk metal band